Larysa Ponomarenko is a Ukrainian Paralympic volleyball player.

Ponomarenko competed at the 2012 Paralympic Games where she won a bronze medal in the women's team event.

References

Year of birth missing (living people)
Living people
Place of birth missing (living people)
Paralympic volleyball players of Ukraine
Ukrainian sitting volleyball players
Women's sitting volleyball players
Paralympic bronze medalists for Ukraine
Volleyball players at the 2008 Summer Paralympics
Volleyball players at the 2012 Summer Paralympics
Volleyball players at the 2016 Summer Paralympics
Medalists at the 2012 Summer Paralympics
Paralympic medalists in volleyball